The European Charter for Regional or Minority Languages (ECRML) is a European treaty (CETS 148) adopted in 1992 under the auspices of the Council of Europe to protect and promote historical regional and minority languages in Europe. However, the charter does not provide any criterion or definition for an idiom to be a minority or a regional language, and the classification stays in the hands of the national state.

The preparation for the charter was undertaken by the predecessor to the current Congress of Local and Regional Authorities, the Standing Conference of Local and Regional Authorities of Europe because involvement of local and regional government was essential. The actual charter was written in the Parliamentary Assembly based on the Congress' Recommendations. It only applies to languages traditionally used by the nationals of the State Parties (thus excluding languages used by recent immigrants from other states, see immigrant languages), which significantly differ from the majority or official language (thus excluding what the state party wishes to consider as mere local dialects of the official or majority language) and that either have a territorial basis (and are therefore traditionally spoken by populations of regions or areas within the State) or are used by linguistic minorities within the State as a whole (thereby including such languages as Yiddish, Romani and Lemko, which are used over a wide geographic area).

Some states, such as Ukraine and Sweden, have tied the status of minority language to the recognized national minorities, which are defined by ethnic, cultural and/or religious criteria, thereby circumventing the Charter's notion of linguistic minority.

Languages that are official within regions, provinces or federal units within a State (for example Catalan in Spain) are not classified as official languages of the State and may therefore benefit from the Charter. On the other hand, Ireland has not been able to sign the Charter on behalf of the Irish language (although a minority language) as it is defined as the first official language of the state. The United Kingdom has ratified the Charter in respect to (among other languages) Welsh in Wales, Scots and Gaelic in Scotland, and Irish in Northern Ireland. France, although a signatory, has been constitutionally blocked from ratifying the Charter in respect to the languages of France.

The charter provides many actions state parties can take to protect and promote historical regional and minority languages. There are two levels of protection—all signatories must apply the lower level of protection to qualifying languages. Signatories may further declare that a qualifying language or languages will benefit from the higher level of protection, which lists a range of actions from which states must agree to undertake at least 35.

Protections
Countries can ratify the charter in respect of its minority languages based on Part II or Part III of the charter, which contain varying principles. Countries can treat languages differently under the charter, for example, in the United Kingdom, the Welsh language is ratified under the general Part II principles as well as the more specific Part III commitments, while the Cornish language is ratified only under Part II.

Part II
Part II of the Charter details eight main principles and objectives upon which States must base their policies and legislation. They are seen as a framework for the preservation of the languages concerned.
Recognition of regional or minority languages as an expression of cultural wealth.
Respect for the geographical area of each regional or minority language.
The need for resolute action to promote such languages.
The facilitation and/or encouragement of the use of such languages, in speech and writing, in public and private life.
The provision of appropriate forms and means for the teaching and study of such languages at all appropriate stages.
The promotion of relevant transnational exchanges.
The prohibition of all forms of unjustified distinction, exclusion, restriction or preference relating to the use of a regional or minority language and intended to discourage or endanger its maintenance or development.
The promotion by states of mutual understanding between all the country's linguistic groups.

Part III
Part III details comprehensive rules, across a number of sectors, by which states agree to abide. Each language to which Part III of the Charter is applied must be named specifically by the government. States must select at least thirty-five of the undertakings in respect to each language. Many provisions contain several options, of varying degrees of stringency, one of which has to be chosen "according to the situation of each language". The areas from which these specific undertakings must be chosen are as follows:
Education
Judicial authorities
Administrative authorities and public services
Media
Cultural activities and facilities
Economic and social life
Transfrontier exchanges

Languages protected under the Charter

See also

 European languages
 Framework Convention for the Protection of National Minorities
 Languages of the European Union
 Linguistic rights
 List of Linguistic Rights in Constitutions (Europe)
 Universal Declaration of Linguistic Rights

Notes and references

External links

European Charter for Regional or Minority Languages text
More information on the treaty
Charter website
Eurolang (News agency about minority languages in Europe)
Explanatory Report on the Charter
lexpress.fr 
Application of the European Charter for Regional or Minority Languages,Doc. 12881

Linguistic rights
Charter for Regional or Minority Language
Languages of Europe
Minority rights
Linguistic minorities
Treaties concluded in 1992
Treaties of Armenia
Treaties of Austria
Treaties of Bosnia and Herzegovina
Treaties of Croatia
Treaties of Cyprus
Treaties of the Czech Republic
Treaties of Denmark
Treaties of Finland
Treaties of Germany
Treaties of Hungary
Treaties of Liechtenstein
Treaties of Luxembourg
Treaties of Montenegro
Treaties of the Netherlands
Treaties of Norway
Treaties of Poland
Treaties of Romania
Treaties of Serbia
Treaties of Serbia and Montenegro
Treaties of Slovakia
Treaties of Slovenia
Treaties of Spain
Treaties of Sweden
Treaties of Switzerland
Treaties of Ukraine
Treaties of the United Kingdom
1992 in France
Treaties extended to Greenland
Treaties extended to the Faroe Islands
Treaties extended to the Isle of Man
Treaties extended to West Berlin
Minority languages